Centrorhynchus is a genus of parasitic worms belonging to the family Centrorhynchidae.

The genus has cosmopolitan distribution.

Species:

Centrorhynchus acanthotrias 
Centrorhynchus albensis 
Centrorhynchus albidus

References

Polymorphida
Acanthocephala families